The definition of marriage varies widely by culture, region and jurisdiction.

Terminology
The stimulus for differentiating married and non-married individuals is sometimes based upon how the companions refer to themselves. In the English language, terms used may be husband or wife or a gender-neutral term such as spouse. In third person, demographics of married people may be referred to by terms such as wedders, as well as by more obscure and nonstandard terms such as wedlockers and gamists.

Contention
When there are social contentions regarding the definition of marriage a concerted effort to delineate the definition may occur. For example, in response to movements in favor of same-sex marriage,  Robert H. Knight wrote:

Giving non-marital relationships the same status as marriage does not expand the definition of marriage; it destroys it. For example, if you declare that, because it has similar properties, grape juice must be labeled identically to wine, you have destroyed the definitions of both “grape juice” and “wine.” The term “marriage” refers specifically to the joining of two people of the opposite sex. When that is lost, the term “marriage” becomes meaningless.

Perception
There may also be a distinction between a formal and an informal marriage. The latter may incur various socioeconomic factors such as custody rights, pension rights, spousal support and distribution of property while the former may not. A prevailing theme within definitions of marriage tends to be that it is at one's discretion, and that unlike wedleases, it is meant to be enduring and lasting.

See also
Definition of religion

References

Marriage
Marriage